Jonas Rutsch (born 24 January 1998) is a German professional road racing cyclist, who currently rides for UCI WorldTeam .

Major results
2018
 2nd Road race, National Under-23 Road Championships
 2nd Eschborn–Frankfurt Under–23
 10th Overall Boucles de la Mayenne
2019
 1st Kattekoers
 6th Overall International Tour of Rhodes
1st  Young rider classification
 6th Overall Tour Alsace
 8th Overall Tour de Luxembourg
 8th Rund um Köln
2022
  National Road Championships
4th Time trial
5th Road race

Grand Tour general classification results timeline

References

External links
 

1998 births
Living people
German male cyclists
Place of birth missing (living people)
People from Erbach im Odenwald
Sportspeople from Darmstadt (region)
Cyclists from Hesse
21st-century German people